Les Lucs-sur-Boulogne is a commune in the Vendée department in the Pays de la Loire region in western France.

History
The site's origins date from the Gallo-Roman period. According to the etymology, the name Lucus meant "Sacred Wood". This implantation is thought to have been an important religious site among local Celtic populations. A stone altar from this period that would have served for a Druidic cult has also been found at Motte du Petit-Luc.

The Lucs-on-Boulogne is famous for the massacre of its population, according to some historians on 28 February 1794, by the infernal columns during the Wars of the Vendée. The mortuary plates of the chapel of Petit Luc bear the names of 564 people massacred on this occasion.

On the occasion of his inauguration, Alexander Solzhenitsyn made a speech in which he drew a parallel between the spirit that animated the politicians applying the Terror and Soviet totalitarianism.

A law dated June 18, 1861 allocates part of the territory of the commune of Lucs-sur-Boulogne to Legé, in the Loire-Inferior, modifying the limits of the departments.

See also
Communes of the Vendée department

References

Communes of Vendée